Justice High School (formerly known as J.E.B. Stuart High School) is a high school in the Lake Barcroft census-designated place, Virginia. The school is part of the Fairfax County Public Schools district. The school has a Falls Church address but is not located within the limits of the City of Falls Church. Per a vote of the county school board, the school was renamed Justice High School effective July 1, 2018.

History

In 1968, the first eight of the JEB Stuart Crew Club travelled to the United Kingdom to participate in the Henley Royal Regatta where they won the Princess Elisabeth Challenge Cup. Instituted in 1946 for public schools in the UK, the PE Challenge Cup was opened to overseas entries in 1964 and JEB Stuart became the third US crew to win the event.

In 1997 the school had one computer for every eight students, which changed to one computer for every 1.8 students in 2003. The school has been featured in National Geographic magazine.

In 2006, then-principal Mel Riddile, former director of Straight, Inc., drug rehabilitation program for teens, was chosen as the principal of the year by the National Association of Secondary School Principals. Riddile moved to T. C. Williams High School in neighboring Alexandria City at the end of the 2005-2006 school year. Assistant Principal Pamela Jones took his place and retired in 2012.

After 40 years at Stuart, veteran math department chair Stu Singer retired in protest when Stuart administrators dismantled a remedial math program that had given Stuart the highest pass rate in the county. Singer later published a book on the program. Singer labeled the dismantling of this program "education malpractice that can only be described as unconscionable." Math scores plummeted after the reorganization. Other successful programs were also dismantled. Faculty morale fell to the lowest in the county, and many teachers retired or transferred out in protest. In 2014, the district sent a support team to Stuart to help the beleaguered administration.

On April 22, 2015, Fairfax County Superintendent of Schools Karen Garza named Penny Gros as principal of Stuart High School. Penny Gros had previously been the principal of Glasgow Middle School, the middle school for the Stuart High School Pyramid.

Maria Eck was named the principal of Justice High School, from July 23, 2018 to June 30, 2021. Eck was serving as principal of Poe Middle School, where she has been a leader since 2014.  Penny Gros moved on to a position in FCPS Region 2. Eck was named the Principal of Spring Hill Elementary School, effective July 1, 2021.

Tiffany Narcisse is the current principal of Justice High School. She was previously a principal in the Houston Independent School District.

Name and controversy
In 1959 when the school opened, the Fairfax County school board opposed racial integration of its schools, and the name, J. E. B. Stuart High School, reflected the school board's sentiments.
In 2015 seniors at the school started a drive to rid Fairfax County Public Schools of names honoring the Confederacy and segregation.  Soon after, many alumni, including prominent names like actress Julianne Moore and film producer Bruce Cohen, joined a petition asking that the name of the school be changed because the honor to Confederate general J. E. B. Stuart was chosen to defy the movement to desegregate public schools after Brown v. Board of Education.

On September 16, 2017, residents of the school area participated in a non-binding vote on new name options, and were able to rank their top three choices. Top choices received five points, second place choices three, and third place choices one. Stuart High School received the most votes.  This was heavily concentrated in first-place and seemed to be a polarizing choice. Under District rules, each household was allowed to cast one vote, regardless of the number of members. But regardless of the vote, the board decided to change the name to Justice.  Later, some board members expressed concern with the Thurgood Marshall name as a possibility as there was already a Marshall High School in the District, named after George C. Marshall and simply was settled without vote but of one member of the board to Justice High School.  It was proposed and finalized.

On October 26, 2017, the school board approved the name Justice High School with a 7-4 vote; one board member described this as a compromise name that collectively honored Thurgood Marshall, Barbara Rose Johns, and Louis Gonzaga Mendez, Jr., among others who worked towards justice. The name change was implemented in summer 2018.

Demographics 
In 2001, Justice High School had "one of the most ethnically diverse student populations in the country." In September 2015 the student body was 50.3% Hispanic/Latino (any race), 23.4% White, 13.6% Asian, 10.1% Black/African American, 2.4% two or more races, and 0.2% American Indian/Alaska Native.

Notable alumni
Bruce Cohen, film producer
Charlie Garner, NFL running back
John Hartman, drummer
Julianne Moore, actress
Penny Moore,  WNBA basketball player
 Jim O'Brien, American Basketball Association player
Esam Omeish, former president of the Muslim American Society
Dave Pruiksma, animator
Jim Sanborn, sculptor best known for creating the Kryptos sculpture at the CIA headquarters
Tom Shadyac, director
Franz Stahl, musician
Jamie Gray Hyder, actress
Anna Heilferty, NWSL soccer player

References

External links
 Justice HS Official Web Site

 

International Baccalaureate schools in Virginia
Educational institutions established in 1959
Stuart
Stuart
J. E. B. Stuart
1959 establishments in Virginia